
Gmina Recz is an urban-rural gmina (administrative district) in Choszczno County, West Pomeranian Voivodeship, in north-western Poland.

Villages
Apart from the town of Recz, Gmina Recz contains the villages and settlements of Bytowo, Chełpina, Grabowiec, Jarostowo, Kraśnik, Lestnica, Lubieniów, Nętkowo, Pamięcin, Pomianka, Pomień, Rajsko, Rybaki, Rybnica, Sicko, Słutowo, Sokoliniec, Suliborek, Sulibórz, Trzebień, Wielgoszcz, Witosław, Zdbino and Żeliszewo.

Neighbouring gminas
Gmina Recz is bordered by the gminas of Choszczno, Dobrzany, Drawno, Ińsko, Kalisz Pomorski and Suchań.

References
Polish official population figures 2006

Recz
Choszczno County